GASB may refer to:

 Great Atlantic Sargassum Belt (GASB)
 Governmental Accounting Standards Board (GASB)
 Gallium antimonide (GaSb)